Damian Jo Lomax Worrad (6 November 1974 – 31 July 2018) was an English cricketer. Worrad was a right-handed batsman who bowled right-arm fast.

Worrad made his debut for Dorset in the 2002 Minor Counties Championship against Wales Minor Counties. From 2002 to 2004, Worrad played 9 Minor Counties matches for Dorset, with his final appearance for the county coming against Cornwall in 2004.

In 2002, Worrad made his List-A debut for Dorset against the Worcestershire Cricket Board in the 1st round of the 2003 Cheltenham & Gloucester Trophy which was played in 2002. Worrad made a further List-A appearance for the county against Yorkshire in the 2nd round of the 2004 Cheltenham & Gloucester Trophy. In his final appearance he removed England Test players Craig White and Chris Silverwood.

Worrad died of a heart attack in July 2018, in Australia, where he had been living since 2005.

References

External links
Damian Worrad at Cricinfo
Damian Worrad at CricketArchive

1974 births
2018 deaths
Sportspeople from Crewe
Cricketers from Cheshire
English cricketers
Dorset cricketers
English emigrants to Australia